Sujatha Vidyalaya is a girls' school in Sri Lanka. Located in the Matara District - Sri Lanka's southernmost district.

The school was established as a private Buddhist school by the Matara Buddhists' Society in 1929.

Sujatha Vidyalaya is one of the oldest Buddhists' schools in Sri Lanka.  Sujatha Vidyalaya is now run by the Government of Sri Lanka, and is a National School. Sujatha Vidyalaya was a school of the first group of schools to be converted as National Schools.

Sujatha Vidyalaya has two sections - primary and secondary. Sujatha Vidyalaya Primary serves students from Grade 1 to Grade 5 and Sujatha Vidyalaya serves students from Grade 6 to Grade 13.

Founding 
In Matara at the beginning of the 20th century, there was a large population of Buddhists, and English education was the fashion. The Matara Buddhist Society took the main role in providing that English education. The energetic co-Secretary of the society, Mr. Vilmot P. Wijethunga, proposed the necessity of an English education institute as a thought. As a result, Dr. V.D. Gunarathna has taken the main role in establishing that proposal.C.A. Ariyathilake, the second son of Matara's leading businessman C.A. Odiris de Silva, donated the present land to the establishment of the school to the government.

On 1929 May full moon Poya day, the school was inaugurated with Mr. V..D. Gunarathna, who was the president of the Matara Buddhist Society, as the director.

At the start, Sujatha Vidyalaya was a mere sapling of a school when compared to what it has grown to today. In the 70 years since its inception, it has become one of the leading girls' schools in the south of the country.

Early years 

Prior to the school shifting to its present site, it was located on a piece of flat coconut plantation at the junctions bordered by the Hakmana Road leading to Veragampita, which is now occupied by the Department of Agriculture. This land belonged to Dr. Gunarathna, president of the Matara Buddhist society.

The old building contained the school office, the 3 upper school classes, a small hall, a hostel for the senior girls, and another hostel for the juniors. There were two other semi-permanent structures, which housed the primary section. They had cemented floors, walls made of planks, and roofs thatched with cadjan.
   
Unlike today, boys under 10 years were admitted to the school and were allowed to remain at this school only till they were 10 years old. In the beginning, there were 36 students and the teaching staff consisted of 4. All the students and teachers were Buddhist.

The society introduced Mrs. A.E. Mathives who came from India as the principal of the school. The girls wore a white uniform with a blue and gold tie pinned at the collar and the boys wore shorts of navy blue and white shirts. White shoes also belonged to the accouterments for the children of this well-integrated small school society.

The medium of instruction was English as was the fashion till 1945 when all schools had to start to revert to the vernaculars. The class texts were imported from England. "Reading and Thinking" was the reader that was used in the Primary section. Sinhala language was also taught as a subject. In addition to the standard curriculum, there was much time devoted to music, dancing, and drama. Almost every term ending was marked by a concert, one of which was of so high standard that it was staged at the Broadway Theater.

The school was conducted in two sessions unlike now, with a lunch break of 45 minutes. The sanitary conditions of the school were excellent. As there was no water on tap, a broad well at the back was created for washing purposes.

In 1930, Doreen Young, who was later to marry Communist leader SA Wickremasinghe, became Principal. She was responsible for young women from Buddhist Theosophical schools joining the anti-Imperialist and socialist movements.

Expansion 

In 1936, the number of students had increased, and therefore the usage of physical properties also increased. The land and old house, which is situated in Gabadaweediya, was converted into a school. It steadily increased from class to class upward from the lowest.

After the death of Dr. Gunarwardana, the school experienced a difficult period to school as the stability of the society was breaking down with the onset of World War II. However, it was a great blessing to the school as Mr. Ariyarathna accepted the managerial post and he made all arrangements to pay salaries for the school teachers from his own money.

Other members of the Buddhist Society and the authors who took the main role to continue the school include

 E. T. Gunawardana
 W. P. Vijethunga
 M. D. T. Kulathilaka
 D. N. J. Weerasooriya
 T. F. D. Abegunawardhana
 C. A. Ariyarathna
 W. P. A. Wickramasinghe
 Jorge Weerathunga
 A. Dayarathna

In 1958 Sujatha Vidyalaya was converted into a government school. Sujatha Vidyalaya was the first Buddhists' girls' school in Matara, has about 5000 students, 188 academic staff, and 35 non-academic staff

Houses 

Yashodara - green

Visakha- blue

Gothami - red

Janaki - purple

Affiliated institutions

Sujatha Dhamma School
Sujatha dhamma School was started in 1995 according to the idea of our early principal Mrs. R.Gunawikcrema. Her main purpose was to give an opportunity of gaining Dhamma School facilities to students who stayed in the school hostel. There are about 300 students and 14 in the staff. Hon. Godawela Pamarathana thera works as the principal of Sujatha Dhamma School.

Sujatha Primary 

Sujatha Primary is located in Welegoda. It was established in 1991, at the place where the "Sudarshana Model School" was. There are classes from grade 1 to grade 5 and about 1500 students with 42 teachers. The principal of Sujatha Primary is Mr. Samarasinghe.

Past principals

Notable alumni

See also 
Rahula College
Education in Sri Lanka

References

External links 
 Sujatha Vidyalaya Official Web Site

Educational institutions established in 1929
National schools in Sri Lanka
Buddhist schools in Sri Lanka
Schools in Matara, Sri Lanka
Girls' schools in Sri Lanka
1929 establishments in Ceylon